The LTPP International Data Analysis Contest or the LTPP Data Analysis Contest is an annual international data analysis contest held by the American Society of Civil Engineers and Federal Highway Administration. As the name suggests, the participants are supposed to use the LTPP data in their analysis. The winners of this data analysis contest are announced in the early January during the Transportation Research Board annual meeting.

History
The LTPP database contains the data of more than 2500 road sections across the US and Canada. The FHWA and ASCE launched a joint effort to encourage researchers around the world to use the LTPP data. The contest was first introduced in 1998 by the Transportation and Development Institute (T&DI) of the American Society of Civil Engineers and the LTPP of FHWA. The goal of the contest is to encourage consultants, academics and data scientists around the world to use the LTPP database for generating knowledge about the behaviour of pavements and roads.

Categories
The LTPP data analysis contest has four different categories:
 Undergraduate Student Category
 Graduate Category
 Partnership Category
 Challenge Category (Aramis Lopez Challenge)
The first two categories are limited to students. The participants of all categories are required to summarize their work within an article.

Winners

See also

 List of engineering awards
 List of mathematics awards

References

Federal Highway Administration
Awards of the American Society of Civil Engineers
Mathematics awards
Engineering awards